"When It's Springtime in Alaska (It's Forty Below)" is a 1959 single by Johnny Horton, written by Tillman Franks and released through Columbia Records. The single was Johnny Horton's sixth release on the country chart and the first of three number ones on the country chart.  The single spent twenty-three weeks on the chart. The song was a marginally successful crossover, reaching #85 on the Music Vendor Pop Top 100.

The song takes place in Fairbanks, Alaska in the springtime. The narrator/singer is a prospector making a trip to Fairbanks after two years in the wilderness; he decides to visit a saloon and hears "redheaded Lil" singing the title words. He and Lil spend the evening dancing, but the singer is unaware that Lil is "Big Ed's wife-to-be." Big Ed discovers the two dancing and throws his knife at the singer, who predicts that he will not survive his wound: "When it's springtime in Alaska, I'll be six feet below." 

While it is very rare for the temperature to actually be that low in the springtime in Fairbanks, it has happened.

References

1959 singles
Johnny Horton songs
Columbia Records singles
1959 songs
Murder ballads
Songs about Alaska
Song articles with missing songwriters